Stephen Fahy (born January 10, 1978) is a Bermudian former swimmer, who specialized in butterfly and individual medley events. He represented Bermuda at the 2000 Summer Olympics, and held two Bermudian records in the 100 m butterfly and 200 m individual medley that stood for more than a decade. While studying in the United States, Fahy is also a member of the Yale University swimming and diving team, also known as Yale Bulldogs, under head coach Frank Keefe.

Fahy competed only in two individual events at the 2000 Summer Olympics in Sydney. He established Bermudian records and achieved FINA B-standards of 56.31 (100 m butterfly) and 2:07.25 (200 m individual medley) from the Pan American Games in Winnipeg, Manitoba, Canada. In the 200 m individual medley, Fahy challenged seven other swimmers in heat three, including Trinidad and Tobago's George Bovell, who later became an Olympic bronze medalist in Athens under the same event. He took a fifth spot and forty-first overall by 3.24 seconds behind Bovell in 2:07.92. The following day, in the 100 m butterfly, Fahy placed fifty-fourth on the morning prelims. Swimming in heat two, he edged out Bahamas' Nicholas Rees to escape from last to a seventh seed by almost a full second in a time of 56.46.

References

1978 births
Living people
Bermudian male swimmers
Swimmers at the 2000 Summer Olympics
Olympic swimmers of Bermuda
Swimmers at the 1999 Pan American Games
Pan American Games competitors for Bermuda
Swimmers at the 1994 Commonwealth Games
Swimmers at the 1998 Commonwealth Games
Commonwealth Games competitors for Bermuda
Male butterfly swimmers
Male medley swimmers
Yale Bulldogs men's swimmers
People from Paget Parish